Lord Fusitua is one of the 34 noble titles in Tonga. It may refer to:

Tevita Alokuoulu, Lord Fusituʻa 1929–1973
Siaosi ‘Alokuo’ulu Wycliffe Fusitu’a, Lord Fusituʻa 1973–2014
Mataiulua i Fonuamotu, Lord Fusituʻa since 2014

Tongan nobility